Clifford Franklin Mapes (March 13, 1922 – December 5, 1996) was a professional baseball player. He played five seasons of Major League Baseball as an outfielder for the New York Yankees, St. Louis Browns and Detroit Tigers.

Professional career
He never played for the Indians, and was later drafted by the New York Yankees in the 1946 Rule 5 draft. After a season in the minors, Mapes was recalled to the Major League level, where he saw limited time as a backup to an outfield that contained Joe DiMaggio, Tommy Henrich, and Johnny Lindell. Mapes hit .250, with 12 runs batted in, and his first career home run.

In his second season, Mapes saw regular time as a starter. He hit .247 with seven home runs and 38 runs batted in, but also led the team in strikeouts in helping the Yankees claim the American League pennant.  He was the team's starting right fielder against the Brooklyn Dodgers, and he helped the team win the 1949 World Series, the team's first World Series en route to five consecutive world championships.

In , Mapes led the team in strikeouts for the second consecutive season. His playing time remained the same, but his power numbers improved from a year earlier. Mapes hit batted .247 with 12 home runs and 61 runs batted in, but also grounded into a team-high 14 double plays. The Yankees finished the season with the American League pennant once again, but Mapes saw little time in the postseason; Mapes only appeared in one game as the Yankees won the 1950 World Series in a four-game sweep of the Philadelphia Phillies.

He was purchased by the St. Louis Browns on July 31, 1951. After a moderate season with the Browns, he was traded with Matt Batts, Dick Littlefield, and Ben Taylor to the Detroit Tigers for Gene Bearden, Bob Cain, and Dick Kryhoski. In , for the Tigers, Mapes hit a career-low .197, and was traded back to the Browns, with Neil Berry and cash, for Jake Crawford. However, Mapes decided to end his professional baseball career, having played his final game on September 28, 1952.

Mapes wore number 3 for the Yankees until that number was retired in honor of Babe Ruth. Mapes then wore number 13 before switching to number 7. When Mapes was traded by the Yankees in 1951, Mickey Mantle took uniform number 7. Mapes, thus, is mainly remembered as the Yankee who wore both Babe Ruth's and Mickey Mantle's numbers.

On December 5, 1996, Mapes died in Pryor, Oklahoma, at the age of 74.

References

External links
, or 

1922 births
1996 deaths
Baseball players from Nebraska
Cedar Rapids Raiders players
Charleston Senators players
Detroit Tigers players
Flint Arrows players
Flint Gems players
Kansas City Blues (baseball) players
Major League Baseball outfielders
New York Yankees players
People from Lincoln County, Nebraska
St. Louis Browns players
Seattle Rainiers players
Toronto Maple Leafs (International League) players
Tulsa Oilers (baseball) players
Wilkes-Barre Barons (baseball) players